The Cincinnati Symphony Orchestra is an American orchestra based in Cincinnati, Ohio.  Its primary concert venue is Music Hall.  In addition to its symphony concerts, the orchestra gives pops concerts as the Cincinnati Pops Orchestra.  The Cincinnati Symphony is the resident orchestra for the Cincinnati May Festival, the Cincinnati Opera, and the Cincinnati Ballet. Additionally, the orchestra supports the Cincinnati Symphony Youth Orchestra (CSYO), a program for young musicians in grades 9 to 12.

History 
Several orchestras had existed in Cincinnati between 1825 and 1872.  The immediate precursor ensemble to the current orchestra was the Cincinnati Orchestra, founded in 1872.  In 1893, Helen Herron Taft founded the Cincinnati Orchestra Association, and the name of the orchestra was formalised to the Cincinnati Symphony Orchestra.  The Cincinnati Symphony Orchestra gave its first concerts in 1895 at Pike's Opera House.  A year later, the orchestra moved to Music Hall. Its first conductor was Frank Van der Stucken, a Texas-born musician of Flemish ancestry, who served until 1907. In the early years, the orchestra welcomed such composers as Richard Strauss and Edward McDowell. The orchestra also performed the U.S. premiere of the Symphony No. 5 of Gustav Mahler.

For three years, the orchestra was disbanded due to labor disputes and financial problems.  Upon its reorganisation in 1909, Leopold Stokowski, then a young organist from England, served as the music director of the newly organised orchestra for 3 years, to 1912, his first music directorship of any orchestra.  In 1911, the orchestra relocated from Music Hall to Emery Auditorium.  Subsequent music directors included Ernst Kunwald through 1918, Eugène Ysaÿe (1918–1922), Fritz Reiner (1922–1933), and Eugene Goossens (1933–1947).  The orchestra returned to Music Hall in 1936.  Its musical landmarks during this period included the U.S. premiere of Mahler's Symphony No. 3 (1912), its first recordings (1917), first national tours, and the world premieres of Aaron Copland's Fanfare for the Common Man and Lincoln Portrait.

Thor Johnson became music director in 1947, and led the orchestra in some of the first stereo recordings for Remington Records.  Max Rudolf succeeded Johnson in 1958.  Thomas Schippers became music director in 1970, but died abruptly in 1977.  The Cincinnati Pops Orchestra was formed in 1977, with Erich Kunzel as its conductor. After Schippers' death, Walter Susskind served as artistic advisor of the orchestra from 1978 until his own death in 1980.

In 1980, Michael Gielen became music director in 1980 and held the post until 1986.  Jesús López-Cobos became music director in 1986.  His achievements included leading on a 1995 European tour, their first since 1969, and their first national television appearance on PBS.  His 15-year music directorship remains the longest tenure of the orchestra.  In September 2001, he became the orchestra's emeritus music director.

Recent history 

From 2001 to 2011, the orchestra's music director was Paavo Järvi.  The orchestra made a number of recordings for the Telarc label during Järvi's tenure.  In January 2007, the orchestra reported financial difficulties, projecting a monetary deficit of about US$2 million for the current fiscal year.  In 2009, those difficulties, in addition to the purchase of Telarc by the Concord Music Group, led to the termination of the orchestra's recording contract.  In late 2009, Cincinnati arts patron and philanthropist Louise Nippert announced a gift of $85 million (USD) for the orchestra.  The orchestra was scheduled to receive directly about $3 million each year (around 75% of its annual distribution).  12% and 5% was allocated to the Cincinnati Opera and Ballet companies, respectively, with the intent of maintaining the Cincinnati Symphony as the resident orchestra for those organisations.
In December 2010, John Morris Russell was named the new conductor of the Cincinnati Pops, following the death in 2009 of Erich Kunzel.  After the conclusion of his music directorship in 2011, Järvi was named music director laureate.  In January 2011, as part of the interim period after the conclusion of Järvi's music directorship and during the search for a new music director, the orchestra named a number of musicians to "Creative Director" posts to curate various concert series.  For the 2011–2012 season, these musicians were:
 Rafael Frühbeck de Burgos, Creative Director of the Masterworks Series 
 Philip Glass, Creative Director of the Boundless Series
 Lang Lang, Creative Director of the Ascent Series
For the 2012–2013 season, Frühbeck de Burgos reprised his role as Creative Director of the Masterworks Series.  For the other two series, new musicians were named as directors:
 Jennifer Higdon, Creative Director of the Boundless Series
 Branford Marsalis, Creative Director of the Ascent Series.

In 2010, the Orchestra launched its own record label, Cincinnati Symphony Orchestra Media. The inaugural album on the new label, "American Portraits," was released internationally in January 2011.  In November 2011, it became the first orchestra in the world to establish a tweeting zone at its concerts.

In March 2011, Louis Langrée first guest-conducted the orchestra.  Based on this appearance, in April 2012, the orchestra named Langrée as its 13th music director, effective as of the 2013–2014 season, with an initial contract of four years.  He took the title of music director-designate with immediate effect.  In March 2015, the orchestra announced the extension of Langrée's contract as music director through the 2019–2020 season.  In February 2017, the orchestra further extended his contract through the 2021–2022 season.  In January 2020, the orchestra announced the newest extension of Langrée's contract, through the 2023–2024 season.  In June 2021, the orchestra announced that Langrée is to conclude his tenure as its music director at the close of the 2023–2024 season.

Premieres 
The following is a list of U.S. and world premieres of works at the Cincinnati Symphony Orchestra and May Festival (MF):

References

External links
Cincinnati Symphony Orchestra

Music Hall: Cincinnati Finds Its Voice Music Hall documentary on WCET-TV

Musical groups established in 1895
Musical groups from Cincinnati
Decca Records artists
Wikipedia requested audio of orchestras
Orchestras based in Ohio
1895 establishments in Ohio
Columbia Records artists